IBI Group Inc. is a Canadian-based architecture, engineering, planning, and technology firm operating from over 60 offices in 12 countries across the world.

Founded in 1974 in Toronto, Canada, IBI Group has since been ranked as one of the largest architecture or architecture/engineering firms in the world: in 2011 it ranked 4th or 6th (depending on the methodology used); in 2016 it was ranked as the 8th largest architecture firm (with 836 fee-earning architects) by BD Online; and in 2016 its United States operations were ranked by ArchDaily as the 13th largest architecture firm in the USA.

As of 2022, IBI Group has approximately 3,400 employees and more than 60 offices located across six continents. IBI Group's consulting services business is concentrated in three practice areas: Intelligence, Buildings and Infrastructure. By integrating productivity tools, processes and technology innovations developed through IBI’s Intelligence practice, the Company has been able to drive incremental growth in its traditional Buildings and Infrastructures practices, while generating more efficient results for IBI clients. The company's mission is to define the cities of tomorrow and its vision is to be the global partner to plan, design and sustain the cities of tomorrow.

On September 27, 2022, it was acquired by Arcadis.

History
The IBI Group was founded in Toronto by nine partners to provide professional planning and design services for urban development and transportation projects.

The firm merged with Robbie/Young + Wright Architects to become Robbie Young + Wright / IBI Group Architects, with noted Toronto architect Rod Robbie as chairman emeritus. In 2004 the firm became a publicly owned entity through the formation of the IBI Income Fund. In 2010 the Fund was converted to a corporation, IBI Group Inc.

The firm's name was derived from the last initials of its two founding principals, Neal Irwin and Phil Beinhaker. The firm has rebranded itself, stating the IBI stands for "Intelligence, Buildings, and Infrastructure."

In September 2022, IBI Group was acquired by Arcadis.

Major acquisitions
Since 2000 the firm has expanded through mergers and acquisitions of consulting firms in multiple locations.  Some have been folded into the IBI Group brand and others have maintained a distinct identity. The major acquisitions below are listed in chronological order.

Cummings Cockburn
In 2004, IBI Group acquired the Ontario architecture and consulting firm Cumming Cockburn, as well as its subsidiaries CCL Consultants and Marshall Cumming & Associates.

Vancouver office
The Vancouver office expanded through the 2005 merger of Hancock Bruckner, Eng + Wright; Lawrence Doyle Architects; and Young + Wright Architects.

Grey-Noble & Grey-Noble
In 2005 the Newmarket, Ontario-based architectural firm of Grey-Noble & Grey-Noble was acquired.

Thomas Blurock Architects
In 2006 the Costa Mesa, California-based educational project-focused firm of Thomas Blurock Architects was acquired and incorporated.

Page+Steele
In 2008 the Toronto-based firm of Page+Steele, Architects was acquired and operates as Page+Steele/IBI Group.

Gruzen Samton Architects
In 2009 the New York City based firm of Gruzen Samton Architects, Planners & Interior Designers was acquired. The firm was founded in 1936 and operates as IBI Group.

Stevens Group Architects
In 2009 the small Toronto-based firm of Stevens Group Architects was acquired. IBI relocated and redistributed its team to a new location and the company and presence dissolved entirely through the following years, due to reputation challenges.

BFGC Architects Planners
In 2009, BFGC Architects Planners, with offices in Bakersfield, San Luis Obispo and San Jose, California, was acquired.

Nightingale Architects
In 2010, Nightingale Architects, with four offices in the United Kingdom, including in London and Cardiff, was acquired for £13.1 million.

Dull Olson Weekes Architects
In 2010, IBI acquired the Portland, Oregon-based firm of Dull Olson Weekes Architects, a regional specialist in the design of educational facilities with offices in Portland and Seattle, Washington.  It has received multiple awards for its work, including the CEFPI/A4LE James D. MacConnell Award for excellence in design and planning, in 2009 for the Rosa Parks School and Community Campus at New Columbia,in 2014 for Trillium Creek Primary School, and in 2020 as a finalist for Mary Lyon Elementary School.  The firm operates as IBI Group Architects.

Cardinal Hardy Architectes
In 2011, the Quebec-based firm of Cardinal Hardy merged with Beinhaker Architecte (within the IBI Group), and became known as Cardinal Hardy Beinhaker Architecte. Groupe Cardinal Hardy merged into the IBI Group. Three years later, in late 2014, it was sold to Montreal-based architecture group Lemay.

Carol R. Johnson Associates
In 2011 the Boston based landscape architecture firm Carol R. Johnson Associates was acquired.

Bay Architects
In 2011 the Houston, Texas-based firm of Bay Architects was acquired.

Taylor Young
In 2012, Taylor Young, a United Kingdom-based architectural and master-planning practice headquartered in Cheshire and with offices in Liverpool and London, was acquired.

M-E Companies
In 2012, M-E Companies, an Ohio-based engineering firm with offices in Westerville, Cincinnati and Canton was acquired.

Aspyr
IBI acquired the British Columbia-based Aspyr Engineering on September 3, 2019.

Cole Engineering Group

IBI acquired the Cole Engineering Group on December 1, 2020.

Major projects
Major projects, ordered by type, are:

Masterplans
Benxi New City, Benxi, China
2012 Summer Olympics - Travel demand management program, London 
 CaféTO, Toronto 
 Al Bandar Development Master Plan, Muscat
 Bhubaneswar Smart City Strategy and Implementation, Bhubaneswar

Government
 States of Jersey Police headquarters, Jersey
 Fire Station 16 and Calgary Fire Department Headquarter, Calgary

Cultural
 Parliament of Canada Visitor Centre Phase 1 (with Moriyama & Teshima Architects), Ottawa 
 Boca Raton Center for the Arts and Innovation, Boca Raton

Education
 41 Cooper Square, New York City
 Diamond Ranch High School (executive architect), Pomona, California
 École secondaire catholique Père-Philippe-Lamarche, Scarborough, Toronto
 Franklin High School renovation
 Heschel School - Ronald P. Stanton Campus, New York City
 Rosa Parks School and Community Campus at New Columbia
 Ridgeview High School (Redmond, Oregon)
 Sabine Pass K-12 School, Sabine Pass
 San Jacinto College Maritime Center, Houston
 Sandy High School, Sandy, Oregon
 School of One, New York City
 Stuyvesant High School, New York City
 Trillium Creek Primary School, Portland

Transportation
 Evergreen Point Floating Bridge, Lake Washington, Washington 
 Pioneer Village station, Toronto
 Victoria Park station (Toronto) renovation
 Confederation Line, Ottawa - station design
 Bloomington GO Station, Richmond Hill, Ontario
 Line 5 Eglinton, Toronto

Office
 Ericsson R&D Complex, Research Triangle Park, North Carolina
 Boston Landing, New Balance World Headquarters, Boston

Leisure
 Delta Toronto Hotel, Toronto
 Oceanside Dolphin Hotel, San Diego

Mixed use
 Holt Renfrew, Calgary, Vancouver and Mississauga
 Parq Vancouver, Vancouver

Residential
 88 Scott Street, Toronto
 Atlantis The Royal, Dubai

Healthcare
 BC Cancer Research Centre, Vancouver (with Henriquez Partners Architects)
 Optegra Eye Hospital, London
 Queen Elizabeth University Hospital, Glasgow
Royal Hospital for Children, Glasgow

Products

HotSpot 
IBI Group acquired mobility solutions provider HotSpot in June 2022 for $5.74 million. Founded in 2013, HotSpot allows users to pay for municipal parking from their phones, or pay for and receive real-time updates about bus services, as well as order and pay for taxis. In a press release published on June 1, 2022 IBI Group noted that the HotSpot would "enhance IBI’s existing traveller information solutions, which have already been deployed in South Africa, North America, and the UK" with CEO Scott Stewart adding that "HotSpot’s proven technology in Canada and inroads into the U.S. will strengthen our market portfolio of smart city solutions and support our strategic expansion goals in the U.S."

CurbIQ
CurbIQ is IBI Group's curbside management tool intended to allow municipalities and mobility companies to manage curbside operations by digitizing their regulation. It was created as a result of IBI Group's Curbside Management Strategy created for the City of Toronto for the 2015 Pan American and Parapan American Games. 

CurbIQ consists of four modules:
Curb Viewer - map-based visualization tool allows municipalities to visualise their existing curbside regulations.
Curb Manager - simplified GIS platform for municipalities to efficiently manage their curbside by adding, removing, or modifying curbside regulations.
Curb Analyzer - quantifies the designations of curb spaces to provide city planners with trends on their usage 
Curb Rules API - to allow transportation network companies, such as ridesharing applications, and commercial vehicle dispatches, to add information about curbside regulations to their own applications.

CurbIQ was used to launch a SENATOR pilot project in Dublin, Ireland that aimed to create a new logistics system to improve the city's transportation network in 2022.

Nspace
Nspace is a desk and conference room booking and visitor management application intended to support flexible work arrangements.

Acquisition by Arcadis
IBI Group announced on July 18, 2022 that it has entered into an agreement with the Dutch design, engineering and management consulting company Arcadis to "acquire all issued and outstanding shares" for $19.50 per share, a thirty percent premium on the day's closing price. The approximately $873 million acquisition was finalised on September 2022 after a shareholder vote.

References

External links
IBI Group corporate structure (see page 7)

2022 mergers and acquisitions
Architecture firms of Canada
Companies based in Toronto
Architecture firms based in Oregon
Engineering consulting firms of Canada
International engineering consulting firms
Companies formerly listed on the Toronto Stock Exchange